Wolfgang Peters (8 January 1929 – 22 September 2003) was a German football player.

Peters played for Borussia Dortmund (1954–1963).

On the national level he played for Germany national team, and was a participant at the 1958 FIFA World Cup.

References

External links 
 

1929 births
2003 deaths
German footballers
Germany international footballers
Association football forwards
Borussia Dortmund players
1958 FIFA World Cup players